Cribroheros robertsoni, also known as the false fire-mouth cichlid is a species of cichlid found in Central America in the Atlantic slope from Mexico to Honduras in  the Coatzacoalcos River.

References

Cichlidae
Fish described in 1905
Taxa named by Charles Tate Regan